Requiem for a Doll (Czech: Requiem pro panenku) is a Czech psychological thriller / drama film inspired by a real-life tragedy that cost the lives of 26 mentally disabled girls. Released in 1992, it was the directorial debut of Filip Renč who also starred in a supporting role and until today it is his most successful movie. It was also the main role debut for the then 14 years old actress Anna Geislerová.

Cast

 Aňa Geislerová
 Eva Holubová
 Barbora Hrzánová
 Filip Renč
 Soňa Valentová
 Jaroslava Hanušová
 Jan Schmid
 Věra Nováková
 Eduard Cupák
 Stanislav Tříska
 Vlasta Mecnarowská
 Zuzana Dančiaková
 Josef Klíma

External links

References

Czech thriller drama films
1990s Czech-language films
1992 films
1992 directorial debut films
Czech films based on actual events